McCalmont is a surname. Notable people with the surname include:

Harry McCalmont (1861–1902), British Army officer, racehorse owner, yachtsman and politician
Hugh McCalmont (1845–1924), British politician
James Martin McCalmont (1847–1913), British Army officer and politician
Robert McCalmont (1881–1953), Northern Irish politician and British Army officer

See also
McCalmont Township, Jefferson County, Pennsylvania
McCalmont Cup, a greyhound racing competition in Kilkenny, Ireland